"Spinning Wheel" is a song from 1968 by the band Blood, Sweat & Tears, written by Canadian lead vocalist David Clayton-Thomas and appearing on their eponymous album.

Released as a single in 1969, "Spinning Wheel" peaked at #2 on the Billboard Hot 100 chart in July of that year, remaining in the runner-up position for three weeks.  "Spinning Wheel" was kept out of the #1 position by both "The Love Theme from Romeo and Juliet" by Henry Mancini and "In the Year 2525" by Zager and Evans. In August of that year, the song topped the Billboard Easy Listening chart for two weeks. It was also a crossover hit, reaching #45 on the US R&B chart.

"Spinning Wheel" was nominated for three Grammy Awards at the 1970 ceremony, winning in the category Best Instrumental Arrangement. The arranger for the song was the band's saxophonist, Fred Lipsius. It was nominated for Record of the Year and Song of the Year; the album won the Grammy for Album of the Year.

Clayton-Thomas was quoted as describing the song as being "written in an age when psychedelic imagery was all over lyrics ... it was my way of saying, 'Don't get too caught up, because everything comes full circle'."

The song ends with the 1815 Austrian tune "O Du Lieber Augustin" ("The More We Get Together" or "Did You Ever See a Lassie?") and drummer Bobby Colomby's comment: "That wasn't too good", followed by laughter from the rest of the group. According to producer James William Guercio this section was inserted at the last minute after the end of the master tape was recorded over accidentally by an engineer at the studio.  Most of this section and Lew Soloff's trumpet solo were edited out for the single version. The eight-bar piano solo which precedes the trumpet solo on the album version is overdubbed with guitar on the single version before the last verse. Alan Rubin sat in on trumpet for Chuck Winfield, who was not able to attend the recording session.

Chart history

Weekly charts

Year-end charts

Cover versions 

Peggy Lee's 1969 single release climbed the Easy Listening chart, with a peak at #24, even before the BST version.
Benny Goodman's  instrumental version was released on a Reader's Digest album in 1973.
 Sammy Davis Jr. included the song on his 1970 album Something for Everyone
 Shirley Bassey included the song on her 1970 album Something.
 Nancy Wilson covered the song in the Hawaii Five-O episode "Trouble in Mind," which originally aired September 23, 1970.
 In 1970 Marianne Mendt released a version of the tune in Austria as "A g'scheckert's Hutschpferd"
 Barbara Eden performed a live version on U.S. television in 1970.
Jazz organist Dr. Lonnie Smith recorded an extended instrumental version for his 1970 Blue Note album Drives.
 American organist Lenny Dee covered Spinning Wheel on an album by the same name in 1970.
 James Brown scored a minor hit in 1971 with an instrumental version of the song, reaching #90 on the Billboard Hot 100. He also performed it at his shows as early as 1969.
 Canadian a cappella music group, Cadence also covered this song.
 In 1970 P. P. Arnold recorded a version produced by Barry Gibb; it remained unreleased for almost five decades until the long-delayed 2017 issuing of her album "The Turning Tide".
 Maynard Ferguson released a big-band arrangement by Adrian Drover on his 1972 album "M.F. Horn Two".
The Milli Vanilli song "All or Nothing", released as a single in 1990, has a similar melody to "Spinning Wheel", and was later the subject of a copyright-infringement lawsuit filed by David Clayton-Thomas.

In popular culture 

An instrumental rendition of this song was used as a cue on the first Wheel of Fortune pilot titled Shopper's Bazaar.
In Germany, a part of the song was used as opening tune for the political cabaret TV show "Neues aus der Anstalt", aired 2007-13.
The song is performed by Jeffrey Tambor's character Hank Kingsley in an episode of The Larry Sanders Show ("Larry's Agent"), where he  creates a more Latin sound to it, hoping to perform tap-dancing along with the song.
"Spinning Wheel" appears in the films Indian Summer, Where the Truth Lies, Tinker Tailor Soldier Spy, and Elvis & Nixon.
In the mid 1980s, a version of the song was used in a British advertisement for Graham & Brown's Superfresco wallpaper.
 In Stage 5 (S6E14) of the HBO series The Sopranos, Paulie Gualtieri mistakenly quotes the song, saying "Ride the painted pony, let the spinnin' wheel glide"

See also 

List of number-one adult contemporary singles of 1969 (U.S.)

References

External links 

 Graham & Brown advertising campaign

1969 singles
1971 singles
Blood, Sweat & Tears songs
RPM Top Singles number-one singles
Song recordings produced by James William Guercio
Song recordings produced by Barry Gibb
James Brown songs
Peggy Lee songs
Grammy Award for Best Instrumental Arrangement Accompanying Vocalist(s)
1968 songs